The African Charter on the Rights and Welfare of the Child (also called the ACRWC or Children's Charter) was adopted by the Organisation of African Unity (OAU) in 1990 (in 2001, the OAU legally became the African Union) and was entered into force in 1999. Like the United Nations Convention on the Rights of the Child (CRC), the Children's Charter is a comprehensive instrument that sets out rights and defines universal principles and norms for the status of children. The ACRWC and the CRC are the only international and regional human rights treaties that cover the whole spectrum of civil, political, economic, social and cultural rights.

It calls for the creation of an African Committee of Experts on the Rights and Welfare of the Child (Committee of Experts). Its mission is to promote and protect the rights established by the ACRWC, to practice applying these rights, and to interpret the disposition of the ACRWC as required of party states, African Union (AU) institutions, or all other institutions recognized by AU or by a member state.

Focus on children's rights in Africa 
Children in Africa are affected by many different types of abuse, including economic and sexual exploitation, gender discrimination in education and access to health, and their involvement in armed conflict. Other factors affecting African children include migration, early marriage, differences between urban and rural areas, child-headed households, street children and poverty. Furthermore, child workers in Sub-Saharan Africa account for about 80 million children or 4 out of every 10 children under 14 years old which is the highest child labour rate in the world.

The ACRWC defines a "child" as a human being below the age of 18 years. It recognises the child's unique and privileged place in African society and that African children need protection and special care. It also acknowledges that children are entitled to the enjoyment of freedom of expression, association, peaceful assembly, thought, religion, and conscience. It aims to protect the private life of the child and safeguard the child against all forms of economic exploitation and against work that is hazardous, interferes with the child's education, or compromises his or her health or physical, social, mental, spiritual, and moral development. It calls for protection against abuse and bad treatment, negative social and cultural practices, all forms of exploitation or sexual abuse, including commercial sexual exploitation, and illegal drug use. It aims to prevent the sale and trafficking of children, kidnapping, and begging of children.

Children's Charter vs. Convention on the Rights of the Child 
The Children's Charter originated because the member states of the AU believed that the CRC missed important socio-cultural and economic realities particular to Africa. It emphasises the need to include African cultural values and experiences when dealing with the rights of the child in such as:
 Challenging traditional African views which often conflict with children's rights such as child marriage, parental rights and obligations towards their children, and children born out of wedlock
 Expressly saying that the Children's Charter is higher than any custom, tradition, cultural or religious practice that doesn't fit with the rights, duties and obligations in the Charter
 The Children's Charter has a clearer definition of the child as a person aged under 18 years old
 Outright prohibition on the recruitment of children (i.e. under 18 years old) in armed conflict and deals with conscription of children into the armed forces
 Prohibiting marriages or betrothals involving children
 Prohibiting the use of children as beggars
 Granting girls the right to return to school after pregnancy
 Promoting affirmative action for girls' education
 Tackling specific African issues that affect children. For example, it called for the confrontation and abolishment of apartheid and similar systems; and although, apartheid is now over, this provision is still applicable to children living under regimes practicing ethnic, religious or other forms of discrimination
 Protecting internally displaced and refugee children
 Protecting imprisoned expectant mothers and mothers of infants and young children
 Providing a way for children themselves to petition the Children's Charter's Committee of Experts regarding infringements of their rights
 Including special reference to care of the child by extended families
 Encouraging the state to provide support for parents "in times of need"
 Protecting handicapped children.

The fundamental principles guiding implementation of these rights include:
 Non-discrimination
 The best interests of the child
 The life, survival and development of the child
 Child participation
 Providing for the responsibilities that every child has with regard to their and society, the state and the international community.

Ratification of the Children's Charter 
As of 2016, the ACRWC has been ratified by 47 of the 54 states of the African Union, and signed but not ratified by the remaining seven states. Central African Republic, Democratic Republic of the Congo, Sahrawi Arab Democratic Republic, São Tomé and Príncipe, Somalia, South Sudan, and Tunisia have signed but not ratified the Charter. Morocco, a non-AU member state, has also not ratified.

Shortcoming and criticism 
 It doesn't protect children from life imprisonment without the possibility of release
 When dealing with criminal activities, there is no provision for alternative measures such as community rehabilitation
 No mention of the rights such as to remain silent, to be protected from retroactive legislation, to challenge detention, or to be compensated for miscarriages of justice
 Article 20 can be construed as supporting physical punishment by parents as it is unclear regarding the meaning of "domestic discipline;"
 There is some confusion regarding Article 31 that deals with children's responsibilities. Children are required to respect parents, superiors and elders at all times which could conflict with the child's right to participate in decisions that affect them
 The omission of a provision which requires countries to fully commit and use their resources means that the Children's Charter has no way to ensure or force states to provide resources to ensure the realisation of children's rights
 Although the Children's Charter makes provision for special protection measures for the disabled, it fails to expressly include disability as a prohibited ground of discrimination
 Unlike the CRC, which specifically ascribes rights to children of minorities, there is no similar provision in the African Charter, despite many countries in the region having significant populations of minority and indigenous groups.

African Committee of Experts on the Rights and Welfare of the Child (Committee of Experts) 
The committee was formed in July 2001, one and half years after the Children's Charter came into force. The members are elected by the Assembly of Heads of State and Government of the African Union. The criteria for the selection of members are:
 Members must be nationals of a state party to the Children's Charter.
 They must be individuals of high moral standing, integrity, impartiality and competence in matters of the rights and welfare of the child.
 Members are nominated by signatory countries and elected by the Assembly of Heads of State of the African Union.
 Members are elected for a term of five years and serve voluntarily in their individual capacity. They may not be re-elected.

The Committee of Experts meets twice each year, usually in May and November in Addis Ababa, Ethiopia. The exact dates depend on other items on the AU agenda around these times. They are empowered to receive and examine the country ("state") reports on the measures they have adopted to implement the provisions of the Children's Charter as well as the progress achieved regarding how the rights are being protected. The final protective function of the Committee of Experts is related to the investigations procedure. They are empowered to resort to any appropriate method of investigation in respect of any issue covered in the Children's Charter.

Members of the African Committee of Experts on the Rights and Welfare of the Child 
The current members of the ACERWC are (name, country, position):
 Mr. Benyam Dawit Mezmur, Ethiopia, Chairperson
 Mrs.Fatima Delladj-Sebaa, Algeria, 1st Vice-President
 Prof Julia Sloth-Nielsen, South Africa, 2nd Vice President
 Mr. Clement Julius Mashamba, Tanzania, 3rd Vice-President
 Mr. Alfas Muvavarigwa Chitakunye, Zimbabwe, Rapporteur
 Mr. Cyprien Adébayo, Benin, Member; (former 1st Vice President 2010-2012)
 Mrs. Agnès Kabore, Burkina Faso, Member;(former Chairperson 2010-2012)
 Mr. Andrianirainy Rasamoely, Madagascar, Member
 Mrs. Maryam Uwais, Nigeria, Member
 Mrs. Amal Muhammad El Henqari, Libya, Member
 Mrs. Félicité Muhimpundu, Rwanda, Member

As at October 2008, the elected Committee of Experts were (name, country, position):
 Ms. Seynabou Ndiaye Diakhate, Sénégal, Chairperson
 Ms. Marie Chantal Koffi Appoh, Côte d'Ivoire, Vice-Chairperson
 Ms Boipelo Lucia Seitlhamo, Botswana, Rapporteur
 Hon. Justice Martha Koome, Kenya, Member
 Mrs. Mamosebi T. Pholo, Lesotho, Member
 Mr. Moussa Sissoko, Mali, Member
 Mrs. Dawlat Ibrahim Hassan, Egypt, Member
 Mr. Cyprien Adébayo, Benin, Member
 Mrs. Agnès Kabore, Burkina Faso, Member
 Mr. Andrianirainy Rasamoely, Madagascar, Member
 Mrs. Maryam Uwais, Nigeria, Member

Challenges faced by the Committee of Experts 
 Functional secretariat: K.F. Malindi Jr, Founder of The Rights Club and a human and child rights activist notes that the Committee of Experts have yet to establish a fully functional secretariat which means that it cannot carry out its activities or deal with communications as well as country reports. It suffers from a serious lack of resources
 Attitude of member states: Many member states are unenthusiastic about the Children's Charter and are often unwilling to nominate suitable people to sit on the Committee of Experts. Often, the committee members resign midway through their term
 Non-state reporting: A look at states’ reporting history to the Committee of Experts also shows non-commitment by countries to fulfil their treaty obligations in respect of the Children's Charter. The responsibility for preparing and submitting country reports differ from country to country, which makes it difficult for the Committee of Experts to follow up with defaulting states
 The rule of pendency & appropriate bodies: Cases cannot be tried or investigated at the same time in two or more human rights bodies. Thus once a case has been brought before the Committee of Experts, it has to remain there until the legal process has been exhausted. The problem is that it takes an average of two and a half years for cases to be decided by the Committee of Experts
 Other problems: Other important setback identified are the constant lack of legal counsel present at sessions of the Committee to give legal guidance on decisions being taken by the Committee; lack of coordinated cooperation and communication between the African Commission and the Committee and the non- prioritising by the AU of the work of the Committee resulting in delays and cancellation of sessions.

State party reporting 
Countries which have ratified the Children's Charter must submit initial reports within two years of ratification or the entry into force of the Charter and every three years thereafter. In 2008, the Committee of Experts started the process of reviewing the first four state reports that had been received from Egypt, Mauritius, Nigeria and Rwanda in May 2008.

The state party report must contain specific information pertaining to children in their country. This includes political, legal, administrative issues that are linked to the requirements of the structure supplied by the Committee of Experts.

Ideally it should be a comprehensive report that includes input from the state, civil society and other recognised bodies at the regional, continental, international levels. But usually, the state report doesn't include much information from civil society. So civil society organisations can submit a second or "alternative" report that contains the information that they have gathered.

Until very recently, this "alternative" report could only be accepted after the state had submitted their report. But now a process has been put into place whereby the state is given 18 months to submit their report, failing that, the "alternative," civil society report will be accepted as that state's report.

Once received, the report then becomes available as a public document and it undergoes a process of:
 Elaboration: The elaboration process is the first process that occurs. The Committee of Experts determines the report's completeness, representativeness, its conformity to the guidelines, etc. and specific information is extracted regarding the children's rights
 Consideration: The consideration process examines the reports to determine if the information supplied reflects the true situation in the country as a kind "photocopy" or "clear picture" at that point in time. This includes determining if there are any gaps or inconsistencies in the information supplied in both the official and the alternative reports
 Follow-up: The follow-up process is where the state and civil society are contacted again to explain and complete any discrepancies or missing information. Further information and interviews may be required before the Committee is satisfied
 Submission to the AU.

Once the State Party and Alternative reports have been finalised, they are submitted to AU Secretariat for translation into the other working languages (English, French, Portuguese and Arabic). Then different Committee of Expert members review the report in a pre-sessional working group in order to identify issues for further discussion with the state and request for any other information that may help when considering the report. Other organisations, civil society organisations, UN groups, who have contributed alternative reports or who are considered relevant may be invited to attend the session on an informal basis. This is where civil society organisations can bring information to the process. A pre-sessional report is produced after this meeting.

After the pre-sessional report has been produced, the members who have been appointed to review the State Party / Alternative Report meet to discuss an in-depth review of the report. Their findings are submitted to the respective state concerned and discussed with high level government representatives. There is no non-governmental organisation or civil society input at this level.

As a result of the in depth discussion, the Committee of Experts will identify problems, progress and differences in implementation of the Children's Charter by the State Party. These recommendations are called "concluding observations" and may include the following:
 The steps that need to be taken
 Agree on recommendations
 Suggest unique decisions suitable for each country
 Changes in the country since the report was prepared
 Follow-ups by the Committee of Experts to obtain more information or clarity.

After the initial State Party / Alternative report has been accepted, the state will then have to submit additional reports every 3 years. These reports are called "periodic reports." This will allow for comparison with the previous report to determine whether there has been progress or if the situation has worsened.

There may also be follow-ups and country visits. The State Party / Alternative Report and recommendations are sent to the Summit of the Heads of States and Government. Civil society is also able to intervene every 3 years to encourage the state to make improvements ahead of the preparation of additional reports.

Observer status for civil society organisations 
Civil society organisations and international institutions have played a significant role in the work of the Committee of Experts and they have served as the backbone of the committee's work since inception. International non-governmental organizations have been particularly involved in the work of the committee, providing different kinds of expertise and financial support to most of the work.

Although civil society organisation involvement was minimal in the beginning, over the intervening years they have since taken a pivotal role in ensuring that the committee fulfills its mandate and in providing the necessary support needed to facilitate its work. The adoption of the guidelines for granting observer status will now also ensure that more civil society organisations are able to formally participate and contribute in the process.

According to the proposed guidelines for observer status, some of the ways civil society organisations and associations will be allowed to participate will include:
 Attending opening and closing ceremonies of the Committee of Experts sessions
 Participating in the committee's meetings
 Accessing documents that are not confidential and do not deal with issues concerning the observers
 Being invited to participate in closed sessions dealing with issues that concern them
 Making statements on issues that concern them, provided the statement has been sent to the committee in advance
 Responding to questions they may be asked in meetings.

The guidelines encourage the formation of coalitions by civil society organisations with similar objectives. The following are the requirements for the participation of civil society organisations for observer status are:
 They must be registered in a member state with the mandate to carry out regional and international activities
 Must have been registered for a minimum of three years
 Must have done work in the defence of children's rights
 They must have a recognised headquarters, democratically adopted statutes and a representative structure
 They must submit a list of documentation to aid their application at least three months before a session of the Committee of Experts.

Once the organisation has obtained observer status, it may request the Committee of Experts to include issues of interest on their agenda and to make oral statements at the sessions. They are entitled to receive information on the time, location and agenda of the sessions of the committee. The committee can invite a civil society organisation to participate in the deliberations of the meetings of the committee without a voting right.

The civil society organisations are also under an obligation to establish close relations with the committee and to hold regular consultations on all issues of common interest. Civil society organisations are required to submit reports on their activities every two years. When civil society organisations default on their obligations, the committee may suspend or withdraw the observer status.

Communications to the Committee of Experts 
A communication is a complaint submitted to the Committee of Experts regarding a violation of the rights of children under the Children's Charter. The following are some guidelines for those wanting to submit a communication to the Committee of Experts:
 A communication may be submitted by individuals, groups, associations, non-governmental organizations, etc.
 These individuals or groups MUST be recognised by the state, AU or international body
 The state is excluded from the complaints process
 Any violation of child rights may be considered
 The country where the violation has occurred must be a signatory of the Children's Charter.

Specific requirements of a communication 
A communication must meet the following criteria:
 It cannot not be anonymous
 It must be written
 It must be submitted within a reasonable deadline or timeframe, depending on the nature of the complaint
 It must be written in a reasonable and non-defamatory tone
 It must be compatible with the AU rules and laws or the Children's Charter
 It must not be exclusively based on information in the media
 Issues must not have been already decided by another investigation, procedure or international regulation
 It must only be submitted when all local / domestic remedies have been exhausted or when the author of the communication is not satisfied with the solution provided at the local / domestic level
 The Committee of Experts can also review its own decision in a communication where the complainant can provide additional information to support his/her case
 The Committee of Experts can receive a communication from a non-State Party (e.g. civil society organisation, individual, group of people) if it is in the best interest of the child.

If the communication meets the above requirements, then it may be considered by the Committee of Experts. When a complaint reaches the committee, a group will be assigned to work on it to decide if it is acceptable. If it is acceptable then they will give feedback both to the country where the problem is located. If there are gaps, then the committee will ask the country to take measures to protect the complainant while it is being investigated further.

The work on the complaint is confidential and is held in closed session debates. Once a decision has been taken, a communication is sent to the country's state department. A member on the Committee of Experts is designated to follow up and coordinate the process. Once the process has been completed, a report is sent to the Committee of the Heads of State and Government.

Children who are the authors or who are the victims in the communication process now have an opportunity to express their opinions to the Committee of Experts. This provision guarantees the cardinal principle of child participation in issues concerning them.

Investigations 
Investigations may be initiated because the Committee of Experts has received a communication indicating a serious violation. Investigation missions can be initiated either by a state referring a matter to the Committee of Experts, or the committee can undertake its own investigations, although the Committee may only visit a State Party if invited to do so by the government.

To ensure the investigative mission team has background knowledge of the situation, a preliminary report according to certain guidelines and based on available information is prepared before each investigation. The mission will meet with available state and non-state organisations and people in the country where they will be investigating.

Once the mission has finished its investigation, it has to release a preliminary result to the government and the media in the country of investigation. A final report is then prepared which incorporates the mission's recommendations. This mission report must be attached to the progress report of the Committee to the African Heads of State and Government.

The country that has been investigated has up to 6 months after the adoption of a decision by the Committee of Experts to submit a written reply on what they have done regarding the requirements or measures in the mission report.

The country's response should also include information on any measures in reaction to the recommendations made by the Committee after the mission. Civil society organisations and ‘specialised institutions’ like children's civil society organisations could also be requested to provide information on the situation of children in that state.

See also 
African Charter on Human and Peoples' Rights
International Day of the African Child

Notes

External links 
 Download Booklet Much of the information on this page is from the booklet "The African Charter on the Rights and Welfare of the Child: A Practical Guide for CSOs" prepared for Save the Children Sweden in Pretoria in October 2009.
 Download a copy of the Children's Charter and a list of countries that have signed and ratified it.
 CRIN Resource Centre A comprehensive site with information and lots of resource links regarding the Children's Charter.
 Read the 14 country reports so far received by the ACERWC
 Read the concept note on procedures to be followed at a pre-sessional meeting
 The web site for the African Committee of Experts on the Rights and Welfare of the Child is still useful information.
 Guidelines for the Initial Reports of State Parties.
 The Danish Institute for Human Rights document on African Human Rights Complaints Handling Mechanisms published in April 2008
 African Child Information Hub A platform for the exchange and dissemination of information and networking among organisations, experts and advocates for the rights and welfare of the child. Documents such as the minutes of the Committee of Experts meetings can be found under the "events" section.
 The African Charter on the Rights and Welfare of the Child - An assessment of the legal value of its substantive provisions by means of a direct comparison to the Convention on the Rights of the Child Michael Gose, Community Law Center, Belleville, 2002, 

Original material used for this section referenced the following sites:
 "Educate a Woman, You Educate a Nation" - South Africa Aims to Improve its Education for Girls WNN - Women News Network. Aug. 28, 2007. Lys Anzia
 Representing Children Worldwide How Children Are Heard in 250 Jurisdictions

Children's rights treaties
African Union treaties
Treaties concluded in 1990
Treaties entered into force in 1999
Child labour treaties
Treaties of Algeria
Treaties of Angola
Treaties of Benin
Treaties of Botswana
Treaties of Burkina Faso
Treaties of Burundi
Treaties of Cameroon
Treaties of Cape Verde
Treaties of Chad
Treaties of the Comoros
Treaties of the Republic of the Congo
Treaties of Djibouti
Treaties of Ivory Coast
Treaties of Egypt
Treaties of Equatorial Guinea
Treaties of Eritrea
Treaties of Ethiopia
Treaties of Gabon
Treaties of the Gambia
Treaties of Ghana
Treaties of Guinea
Treaties of Guinea-Bissau
Treaties of Kenya
Treaties of Lesotho
Treaties of Liberia
Treaties of the Libyan Arab Jamahiriya
Treaties of Madagascar
Treaties of Malawi
Treaties of Mali
Treaties of Mauritania
Treaties of Mauritius
Treaties of Mozambique
Treaties of Namibia
Treaties of Niger
Treaties of Nigeria
Treaties of Rwanda
Treaties of Senegal
Treaties of Seychelles
Treaties of Sierra Leone
Treaties of South Africa
Treaties of the Republic of the Sudan (1985–2011)
Treaties of Eswatini
Treaties of Tanzania
Treaties of Togo
Treaties of Uganda
Treaties of Zambia
Treaties of Zimbabwe
1990 in Ethiopia